Luisa Piccarreta, (23 April 1865–4 March 1947) now a Servant of God and also known as the "Little Daughter of the Divine Will", was a Catholic mystic and author whose spirituality centred on union with the Will of God.

For some time, her confessor was Saint Annibale Maria di Francia. Piccarreta is currently under investigation for possible canonization as a saint of the Church.

Biography 
Luisa Piccarreta was born in the comune of Corato in the former Province of Bari, southern Italy, on 23 April 1865 to Vito Nicola and Rosa Tarantino Piccarreta. She received only a first grade education, and as a teenager she joined the Third Order of Saint Dominic. As an adult, she took up lacemaking. 

By 1889, she became bedridden. After Luisa "Little Daughter of the Divine Will" had been living continuously the Hours of the Passion for over thirty years, Annibale Maria di Francia, (now Saint) who had been appointed as the Ecclesiastical Censure for all her writings.  In February of that year, Hannibal Maria Di Francia asked her to begin a diary of her spiritual experiences.  After the S.G. Luisa Piccarreta finished writing the original manuscript she sent it to St. Hannibal along with a letter. In this letter she speaks of the complacency that Jesus feels whenever we meditate on these Hours. She says, “as if Jesus heard His own voice and His prayers being reproduced in those reparations, just as the ones He raised to His Father during the 24 hours of His sorrowful Passion.” Also, Luisa included along with the manuscript and letter some additional notes in which she listed the effects and promises that Jesus makes to whoever meditates on these Hours of His Passion.

In 1926, Annibale Maria di Francia was in Trani to open branches of his newly established institutes; he asked her to write her autobiography. She did this until 1938, with her writings running to thirty-six volumes. Piccarreta died of pneumonia on 4 March 1947, at the age of 82.

Cause for canonization 
In 1994, the Archbishop of Trani-Barletta-Bisceglie opened her cause for beatification. By October 2005, the diocesan-level process of inquiry and documentation within the Diocese of Trani-Barletta-Bisceglie-Nazareth was completed. Her case was then passed on to the Congregation for the Causes of Saints at the Holy See, and she was titled "Servant of God".

Writings 

"This creature, Luisa, who was visited by suffering --because indeed in her life of a confirmed Christian the Lord asked of her something exceptional, something special - said "yes" to Christ; and Christ identified her completely with the one plan of the Father..." ("Luisa la Santa" Archbishop Giovanni Battista Pichierri, May 2000)

In 2007, the investigation turned to examining Piccarreta's writings, "...to clarify difficulties of a theological nature." This review was somewhat complicated by the fact that she wrote her works in the Barese dialect of Neapolitan. In a letter dated 1 November 2012, Archbishop Giovan Battista Pichierri pointed out that until such time as the review was finished, it would have been premature to render any opinion as to whether or not Piccarreta's writings conformed to Catholic teaching. Archbishop Pichierri also stated that a "typical and critical edition" of her writings will then be issued. He further specified that the Archdiocese is not the legal owner of her writings.

On 1 November 2012, Archbishop Pichierri reiterated what he had earlier observed in 2006, "that the doctrine of the Divine Will has not always been presented in a respectful and correct manner, according to the Doctrine of the Church and the Magisterium, placing on the lips of Luisa claims that not even implicitly are found in her writings. This causes trauma in the consciousness and even confusion and rejection in people and among the priests and bishops." (Letter of 09 March 2006).

"...the initiatives that are taken in reference to the spirituality of Luisa, such as conferences, days of spirituality, prayer meetings, etc., To give peace of mind to those who participate, and do not need authorization by their Bishop." (Letter dated 24 November 2003).

References

External links

 Official website of the Cause
(Feb.18.2021: this site is not available, has been expired)

 
 

 

 . 

1865 births
1947 deaths
19th-century Italian women writers
20th-century Italian women writers
20th-century venerated Christians
Italian religious writers
Italian Servants of God
Roman Catholic mystics
People from the Province of Bari
Women religious writers